Möllenhagen is a municipality  in the Mecklenburgische Seenplatte district, in Mecklenburg-Vorpommern, Germany.

Personalities 

 Adolf Georg of Maltzan (1877–1927), German diplomat
 Friedrich Griese (1890–1975), writer, important representative of the Mecklenburg local literature and blood-and-soil poet

References